Church and 18th Street station (also known as Right Of Way/18th Street) is a light rail stop on the Muni Metro J Church line, located in the northwest corner of Dolores Park in San Francisco, California. The stop opened with the line on August 11, 1917. The eastbound (inbound) platform is located inside Dolores Park on Muni's right of way; the westbound (outbound) platform is a traffic island on Church Street. Mini-high platforms providing access to people with disabilities are located inside the park next to 18th Street.

In March 2014, Muni released details of the proposed implementation of their Transit Effectiveness Project (later rebranded MuniForward), which included a variety of stop changes for the J Church line. Under that proposal, the westbound platform would be moved inside Dolores Park opposite the eastbound platform.

References

External links 

SFMTA – Right Of Way/18th St, Church St & 18th St
SFBay Transit (unofficial) – Right Of Way/18th St, Church St & 18th St

Muni Metro stations
Castro District, San Francisco
Railway stations in the United States opened in 1917